Jamal Yaseem Igle is an American comic book artist, editor, art director, marketing executive and animation storyboard artist. The creator of the comic book series Molly Danger he is also known for his pencilling, inking and coloring work on books such as Supergirl and Firestorm.

Career

Igle decided he wanted to be a professional comic book artist at the age of 14. Igle attained his first job in comics at 17, as an intern at DC Comics, while still attending the High School of Art and Design. Igle attended the School of Visual Arts. After college, he worked as a junior art director at an advertisement agency and in a marketing company. Igle's first break as an artist was with a now-defunct publisher called Majestic Entertainment in 1993. He built his resume working for a number of small publishers for years until about 1999, when he left comics for a while to work at Sony Animation. Igle spent several months as a storyboard artist for several CGI animated series such as Max Steel and Roughnecks: Starship Troopers Chronicles. It was during his time at Sony that he received a call from editor Bobbie Chase at Marvel Comics to work on New Warriors with Jay Faerber. He has been working in comics ever since.
Igle has worked in books ranging from The Narrative of the Life of Frederick Douglass, the all-ages action miniseries Race Against Time as well as fill-in issues in mainstream titles such as Green Lantern, G.I. Joe, Martian Manhunter and Supergirl.  With writer Jay Faerber has done several works: a four issue run on New Warriors and an Iron Fist/Wolverine miniseries for Marvel Comics, and Venture, a short-lived creator-owned series for Image Comics. He became the regular artist of DC Comics' ongoing Firestorm series, beginning with issue #8 (December 2004). In November 2006, DC Comics announced that Igle would be taking over as series artist of Nightwing.

Igle has worked on several projects outside of the United States including the Army of Angels graphic novel for Humanoids Publishing/DC Comics and  Perry Rhodan for  The Perry Rhodan company in Germany.

In December 2005, Jamal signed an exclusive contract with DC Comics, which was publicly announced on January 10, 2006. As part of the contract's announcement, DC Editor Steve Wacker described Jamal as a "triple threat," stating "Jamal has the best combination in an artist: he's scary talented, super reliable, and one of the nicest guys in the business." Igle was also honored at the 40th Anniversary edition of Comic Con international: San Diego with the Inkpot Award for Achievement in Comic Art.

Igle was the artist on the Ray title that debuted in September 2011 as part of the DC's New 52 relaunch.

On January 2, 2012, Igle announced the end of his DC Comics exclusive contract on his personal blog.
Igle launched his creator owned series via the crowdfunding website Kickstarter in August 2012, raising $50, 329.00 in 30 days. The book was published through Action Lab Comics, where Igle also serves as Vice President of Marketing.

Art style
Regarding the influences on his art style, Igle has stated:

Other work
According to his website, Igle is an active volunteer with the Museum of Comic and Cartoon Art, as well as a guest lecturer on the subject of comics and animation.

In July 2006, Jamal joined the staff of the Art Students League of New York.

Personal life
Igle and his wife Karine have a daughter named Catherine. They live in Brooklyn.

Bibliography

Crusade
 Shi: The Way of the Warrior #8 (1996)
 Shi: Kaidan #1
 Atomik Angels #1
 Tomoe/Witchblade: Fire Sermon (1996)

Dark Horse Comics
The Terminator: Enemy of My Enemy six issue series (2014)

Dark Angel
 Race against Time #1-3
 Blackjack: Blood and Honor

DC
Action Comics #900 (among other artists) (2011)
Countdown to Final Crisis #21, 4 (2007–08)
Countdown: Search for Ray Palmer, miniseries, #1 (2007)
Famous first: Green Lantern (2002)
Golden Age Secret Files (Dr. Sivana) (2001)
Green Lantern, vol. 3, #52 (among other artists) (1994); #146, 157, 174, Secret Files #3 (2002–04)
Green Lantern Corps #18 (2007)
Impulse #58 (along with Grey) (2000)
Kobalt #7 (1994)
Martian Manhunter #36 (2001)
Sensation Comics featuring Wonder Woman #11 (2015)
Supergirl, vol. 3, #71 (2002)
Supergirl, vol. 4, #34-40, 42-46, 50-59 (2008–11)
Superman # 713-714 (2011)
Superman: War of the Supermen, miniseries, #1 (2010)
Firestorm, vol. 3, #8-10,12-21,23-32 (2004–06)
Nightwing #129-131, 133-134 (2007)
Teen Titans vol. 5, # 52, 55 (2007–08)
Tangent: Superman's Reign, miniseries, #2-6 (2008)
The Ray Miniseries, #1-4 (2011–2012)
Wonder Woman: Our Worlds at War (among other artists) (2001)
World's Finest, miniseries,(Supergirl & Batgirl) #3 (2009)
Zatanna #11, 13-15 (2011)

Marvel
 Daredevil/Shi: Blind Faith (1997)
 New Warriors, vol. 2, #7-10 (2000)
 Iron Fist and Wolverine, miniseries, #1-4 (2000–01)
 Iron Man, vol. 3, #44 (along with Keron Grant; 2001)Marvel Age Spider-Man #14

Other publishers
 G.I. Joe #8, 10
 Noble Causes #2 (Image, 2002)
 Trinity Angels #10-11 (along with other artists) (Acclaim, 1998)
 Venture, miniseries, #1-4 (Image, 2003)
 Gateway Legends #2 (Originally penciled in 1996 for Living Legends Entertainment) (Gateway Comics, 2012)
 KISS #1-2,covers for issues 5 and 6  (IDW publishing, 2012)
 Molly Danger: Book One (Action Lab Entertainment, 2013)
 BLACK 1-6 (Black Mask Studios, 2017)
 The Wrong Earth 1-6 (Ahoy Comics, 2018)
 The Wrong Earth: Night and Day ''1-6 (Ahoy Comics, 2020)

References

External links

 JamalIgle.com Jamal Igle official website.

 Comic Geek Speak Comic Geek Interview with Jamal Igle at the 2006 New York Comic-con
 Comic Geek Speak Interview May 2006 With Jamal Igle
 Where Monsters Dwell interview 
 The Comics Journal “I Spent Seven Years in the Belly of the Beast”: An Interview with Jamal Igle

American comics artists
African-American comics creators
American comics creators
1972 births
Living people
People from Harlem
Marvel Comics people
DC Comics people
High School of Art and Design alumni
21st-century African-American people
20th-century African-American people